Toivo Räsänen (8 June 1925 – 15 October 2002) was a Finnish rower. He competed in the men's eight event at the 1952 Summer Olympics.

References

1925 births
2002 deaths
Finnish male rowers
Olympic rowers of Finland
Rowers at the 1952 Summer Olympics